Chhoona Hai Aasmaan is a Hindi television serial that aired on Star One.It's about six Indian air force officers who form a team called the HAWKS. Their duty is to save the country from any terrorist attacks.

Cast
 Mohammed Iqbal Khan as Flight Lieutenant / Wing Commander Abhimanyu Adhikari (2007-2008)
 Nikhil Arya as Flight Lieutenant / Wing Commander Abhimanyu Adhikari (2008)
 Janvi Chheda as Flight Lieutenant Sameera Singh
 Manish Paul as Flight Lieutenant Farhaan Zaidi
 Vaani Sharma as Flight Lieutenant Tanvi Sharma 
 Vivan Bhatena as Flight Lieutenant Samrat Singh Shekhawat / Jahan Sheikh
 Aparna Kumar as Flight Lieutenant Isha Oberoi
 Dalljiet Kaur as Shikha Singh
 Narendra Jha as  Group Captain Aryaveer Pratap Singh
 Vaishnavi Mahant  as Sapna Singh
 Payal Nair as Sunaina Aryaveer Pratap Singh
 Shakti Singh as Defense Minister Upadhyay
 Adita Wahi as Shaheen
 Vishal Watwani as Terrorist
 Abhinav Kohli as Flight Lieutenant Sameer Singh
 Tuhina Vohra as Veena Adhikari
 Lalit Tiwari as Hyder Sheikh
 Hunar Hali as Rashi Upadhyay / Nisha
 Amit Behl as Group Captain Karan Trivedi
 Sanjeev Seth as Senior Air Force Officer
 Dinesh Mehta as Air Force Officer
 Ashok Lokhande as Nasir Khan
 Kunal Bakshi as Terrorist
 Sailesh Gulabani as Rocky
 Goga Kapoor as Rahim
 Jayshree T. as Pragya Ujjwal Upadhyay
 Vineet Sharma as Aftab Sheikh
 Omar Vani as Krish Mehra
 Nitika Anand as Nishita
 Parth Mehrotra as Mannu
 Madan Joshi as Mr. Singh
 Nandita Thakur as Mrs. Singh
 Ahmed Khan as Mr. Adhikari
 Gulshan Pandey as Mr. Thapar

References

External links

2007 Indian television series debuts
2008 Indian television series endings
Star One (Indian TV channel) original programming
Indian crime television series
Aviation television series
Indian Armed Forces in fiction
Hindi-language television shows